Rizlen Zouak (born 14 May 1986, Beaune, France) is a French-Moroccan judoka and mixed martial arts fighter. At the 2012 Summer Olympics she competed in the Women's 63 kg, but was defeated in the first round. On Saturday 24 June, Rizlen Zouak made her debut in MMA against Leah McCourt at Cage Warriors 85 for the British MMA organisation Cage Warriors. She won the fight by TKO in the second round.

Mixed martial arts record

|-
|Win
|align=center|7–5
|Iony Razafiarison
|Decision (unanimous)
|Ares FC 9
|
|align=center|3
|align=center|5:00
|Paris, France
|
|-
|Loss
|align=center|6–5
|Melissa Dixon
|Decision (unanimous)
|Ares FC 7
|
|align=center|3
|align=center|5:00
|Paris, France
|
|-
|Win
|align=center|6–4
|Flordinice Muniz
|Decision (unanimous)
|Ares FC 4
|
|align=center|3
|align=center|5:00
|Paris, France
|
|-
|Loss
|align=center|5–4
|Gisele Moreira
|TKO (body kick and punches)
|Ares FC 2
|
|align=center|2
|align=center|2:57
|Paris, France
|
|-
| Win
| align=center| 5–3
| Jenny Gotti
| Decision (unanimous)
| Mixed Martial Arts Grand Prix 4
| 
| align=center|3
| align=center|5:00
| Paris, France
| 
|-
| Loss
| align=center| 4–3
| Marta Waliczek
| Decision (unanimous)
| OKTAGON 25
| 
| align=center|3
| align=center|5:00
| Brno, Czech Republic
|
|-
| Win
| align=center| 4–2
| Senna van der Veerdonk
| Decision (unanimous)
| FFA Challenge 1
| 
| align=center|3
| align=center|5:00
| Paris, France
| 
|-
| Loss
| align=center| 3–2
| Lucia Szabová
| Submission (armbar)
| OKTAGON 21
| 
| align=center|2
| align=center|1:25
| Brno, Czech Republic
| 
|-
| Loss
| align=center| 3–1
| Amanda Lino
| TKO (punches)
| EFC Worldwide 70
| 
| align=center|3
| align=center|3:11
|Durban, South Africa
| 
|-
| Win
| align=center| 3–0
| Jacqualine T. Feddersen
| TKO (punches)
| EFC Worldwide 66 
| 
| align=center|1
| align=center|0:27
|Pretoria, South Africa
|
|-
| Win
| align=center| 2–0
| Bunmi Ojewole 
| TKO (punches)
| EFC Worldwide 62 
| 
| align=center|2
| align=center|1:08
|Johannesburg, South Africa
|
|-
| Win
| align=center| 1–0
| Leah McCourt
| TKO (punches)
| Cage Warriors 85
| 
| align=center|2
| align=center|3:46
|Bournemouth, England
|
|-
|}

References

External links
 
 
 
 

1986 births
Moroccan female mixed martial artists
Mixed martial artists utilizing judo
People from Beaune
Mediterranean Games bronze medalists for Morocco
Competitors at the 2013 Mediterranean Games
Moroccan female judoka
Living people
Olympic judoka of Morocco
Judoka at the 2012 Summer Olympics
Judoka at the 2016 Summer Olympics
Mediterranean Games medalists in judo
Sportspeople from Côte-d'Or